The 2004–05 CBA season is the tenth CBA season.

The season ran from November 14, 2004 to April 14, 2005. Beijing Olympians was disqualified for this season.

Promotion and relegation were both abolished since the end of the previous season. The Second Division was renamed NBL. Top finishing teams from the NBL may choose to join the CBA as long as a team meets all items of the criteria set by the CBA Board. As a result, Yunnan Bulls, Fujian Xunxing and Henan Dragons joined the league in this season.

For this season, the league was divided into a North Division (北区) and a South Division (南区), and a new playoff system was also introduced.  The regular season consisted of 266 matches, with each team playing 38 matches (four against each of six other teams within its division and two against each of seven teams in the other division).

The all-star game was played on March 6, 2005 in Nanjing, after the end of the regular season and before the beginning of the playoffs: the North Division defeated the South Division 103-99, and Mengke Bateer was the MVP.  Also, all-star games were played against the KBL, on January 28, 2005 in Korea and January 30, 2005 in Harbin, China.  Korea won the first game 85-82; China won the second game 93-77.

Regular season standings

Divisional Championships
In the Divisional Championships (分区冠军赛), top 4 teams played with others from the same division in a knock-out bracket.

Winners became the Divisional Champions. No teams were eliminated, the result of the Divisional Championships were used to re-seed teams in the Playoffs.

As it turned out, the only change of seeding was that Jiangsu and Guangdong switched places (S1 and S2).

Playoffs 

In the Final series, Guangdong Southern Tigers defeated Jiangsu Dragons (3-2). Bayi failed to make the finals for the first time ever.

Teams in bold advanced to the next round. The numbers to the left of each team indicate the team's seeding in Divisional Championships, and the numbers to the right indicate the number of games the team won in that round. Home court advantage belongs to the team with the better regular season record; teams enjoying the home advantage are shown in italics.

See also
Chinese Basketball Association

References

 
Chinese Basketball Association seasons
League
CBA